Nawab Ali Quli Mirza Bahadur was the ancestor of Nawabs of Banganapalle and Masulipatam. He belongs to The Najm-i-Sani Dynasty.

Genealogy
He was  elder son of Faiz Beg Najm-i-Sani, and grandson of Nawab Mirza Muhammad Bakir Khan Najm-i-Sani a Grandson of the Ottoman Prince Şehzade Ahmet, sometime Subadar of Multan, Oudh, Orissa, Gujarat and Delhi. He was Wazir to Emperor Aurangzeb. His grandfather was married to a sister of Imad ul-Mulk, Nawab Khwaja Muhammad Mubariz Khan Bahadur, Hizbar Jang, sometime Subadar of the Deccan and Wazir.

Nawab Ali Quli Khan Bahadur had three sons,
Fazl Ali Khan Bahadur, Qiladar of Chenchelimala.
Faiz Ali Khan Bahadur, Sometime Qiladar of Banganapalle and Chenchelimala, ancestor of the Nawabs of Banganapalle.
Yusuf Khan Bahadur, father of Nawab Muhammad Taqi Khan Bahadur, Nawab of Masulipatam.

Titles held
Subadar of Multan, Oudh, Orissa, Gujarat and Delhi.
Wazir to Emperor Aurangzeb.

See also
Nawab of Carnatic
Nawab of Banganapalle
Nawab of Masulipatam

Nawabs of India
Mughal nobility